Flavia Julia Constantia (after 293 – c. 330) was the daughter of the Roman Emperor Constantius Chlorus and his second wife, Flavia Maximiana Theodora.

In 313, Emperor Constantine the Great, who was the half-brother of Constantia, gave her in marriage to his co-emperor Licinius, on occasion of their meeting in Mediolanum. She bore a son, Valerius Licinianus Licinius, in 315, and when the struggle between Constantine and Licinius began in 316, she stayed on her husband's side. A second war started between the two emperors in 324; after Licinius' defeat, Constantia interceded with Constantine for her husband's life. Constantine spared Licinius' life, and obliged him to live in Thessalonica as a private citizen, but the following year (325), he ordered that Licinius be killed. A second blow for Constantia was the death, also by order of Constantine, of her son Valerius.

In the following years, Constantia lived at her brother's court, receiving honors (her title was nobilissima femina). Constantia was her brother's favourite sister and proof of such favour is that he minted coins with her image and with the title "Constantia Soror Constantini AVG," or, "Constantia, Sister of Constantine Augustus" ("AVG" is an abbreviation of "Augustus," the center consonant being a "manuscript U," not a "V"). She converted to Christianity, supporting the Arian party at the First Council of Nicaea (325).

The city of Constanţa, Romania is named after her.

Notes

References
 Constantia, at De Imperatoribus Romanis

290s births
330s deaths
4th-century deaths
Converts to Christianity from pagan religions
Flavia Julia
Julia Constantia
Constantia, Flavia
4th-century Roman empresses
4th-century Arian Christians
Year of birth uncertain
Daughters of Roman emperors